Francesco Salesio Della Volpe (24 December 1844 in Ravenna, Italy - 5 November 1916 in Rome, Italy) was an Italian Catholic Cardinal from a noble family. He held the position of secretary of the Congregation of Indulgences and Relics and prefect of the Prefecture of the Pontifical Household. Created cardinal in pectore in 1899, he was named published in consistory of 1901. He was prefect of the Congregation of the Index from January 1911. As protodeacon, he announced the election of cardinal Giacomo Della Chiesa to the papacy at the end of the conclave of 1914.

External links
The Cardinals of the Holy Roman Church
Catholic Hierarchy

1844 births
1916 deaths
Italian archivists
20th-century Italian cardinals
20th-century Italian Roman Catholic titular archbishops
Protodeacons
People from the Province of Ravenna
Camerlengos of the Holy Roman Church
Cardinals created by Pope Leo XIII